English River may refer to:

Rivers
 English River (Ontario), a tributary of the  Winnipeg River in Northwestern Ontario, Canada
 English River (Chateauguay River tributary), flowing from New York, United States, into Quebec, Canada
 English River (Iowa), a tributary of the Iowa River in southeastern Iowa in the United States
 Rivière aux Anglais (English's River),  a tributary of the St. Lawrence River in Quebec, Canada

Places

Canada
 English River, Ontario, an unincorporated place in Northwestern Ontario, Canada
English River 21, Indian Reserve in Kenora District, Ontario, Canada
 English River 66, Indian Reserve in Cochrane District, Ontario, Canada
 English River 192H, Indian Reserve on an island in Porter Lake, Saskatchewan, Canada

United States
English River Township, Keokuk County, Iowa, a township in Iowa, United States
English River Township, Washington County, Iowa, a township in Iowa, United States

Other
 English River, Seychelles, an administrative district of Seychelles on the island of Mahé

Other uses
 English River (ship), a Canadian lake freighter
English River First Nation, a Dene First Nation band government in Patuanak, Saskatchewan, Canada

See also
English River Formation, a geological formation in Illinois, United States